Thorunna arbuta is a species of dorid nudibranch in the family Chromodorididae.

Distribution 
This species was described from Danger Point, Torquay, Victoria, Australia, .

Description
Thorunna arbuta has a body colour of bright pink with paler mottling, the foot, rhinophores and gills are the same colour. The mantle margin is indented at the sides and at each indent there is a large rounded patch of yellow edged with bright red flecks.

References

Chromodorididae
Gastropods described in 1992